The Miami-Dade County Corrections and Rehabilitation Department is an agency of the government of Miami-Dade County, Florida. It has its headquarters in the Gladeview census-designated place in an unincorporated area. The agency has the eighth largest jail system in the United States. As of 2012 about 6,000 people are incarcerated in the facilities of the department. The agency houses pre-trial prisoners and post-trial prisoners who are serving sentences of 364 or fewer days.

Facilities
As of 2012, on average the prisons hold around 7,000 prisoners.
Metro West Detention Center
Located in an unincorporated area. It is the largest jail in the county and has a capacity of 3,098 prisoners.
Pre-Trial Detention Center
Located in Miami. It has a capacity of 1,712 prisoners. It houses prisoners of all ranges from those with the most serious charges to those of the most minor charges.
Training and Treatment Center
Located in an unincorporated area. It has a capacity of 1,265 prisoners.
Turner Guilford Knight Correctional Center (men and women)
Located in an unincorporated area. It has a capacity of 1,300 prisoners.
Women's Detention Center
Located in Miami. It has a capacity of 375 prisoners.

References

External links

Miami-Dade County Corrections and Rehabilitation Department

Government of Miami-Dade County, Florida
Prison and correctional agencies in the United States
Penal system in Florida
County law enforcement agencies of Florida